Eadaoin Ní Challarain (born 19 September 1975 in Spiddal) is an Irish slalom canoer who competed in two Olympic Games. She finished 18th in the K-1 event at the 2000 Summer Olympics in Sydney. Four years later in Athens she finished in 11th place in the same event. She also competed in Freestyle Kayaking.

References
Sports-Reference.com profile
Yahoo! Sports Athens 2004 profile

 

1975 births
Canoeists at the 2000 Summer Olympics
Canoeists at the 2004 Summer Olympics
20th-century Irish people
21st-century Irish people
Irish female canoeists
Living people
Olympic canoeists of Ireland
Sportspeople from County Galway
People from County Galway